Kwon Hyuk (born November 6, 1983 in Daegu, South Korea) is a baseball player from South Korea who won a gold medal at the 2008 Summer Olympics.

References

External links

Career statistics and player information from the KBO League

1983 births
Baseball players at the 2008 Summer Olympics
KBO League pitchers
Living people
Medalists at the 2008 Summer Olympics
Olympic baseball players of South Korea
Olympic gold medalists for South Korea
Olympic medalists in baseball
Samsung Lions players
South Korean baseball players
Sportspeople from Daegu
South Korean Buddhists